Spider Baby: or, the Maddest Story Ever Told is a 1967 American black comedy horror film, written and directed by Jack Hill. It stars Lon Chaney Jr. as Bruno, the chauffeur and caretaker of three orphaned siblings who suffer from "Merrye Syndrome", a genetic condition starting in early puberty that causes them to regress mentally, socially and physically. Jill Banner, Carol Ohmart, Quinn Redeker, Beverly Washburn, Sid Haig, Mary Mitchel, Karl Schanzer and Mantan Moreland also star.

The film was released to relative obscurity, but eventually achieved cult status.

Plot
At the decaying Merrye House, feared by locals, the Merrye children Ralph, Virginia, and Elizabeth have lived in seclusion with the family chauffeur Bruno ever since their parents died. All three have advanced Merrye Syndrome, a genetic affliction unique to members of the family which causes them, starting in late childhood, to regress down the evolutionary ladder mentally and physically. They exhibit a playful innocence well before their years mixed with feral madness. Ralph is a sexually advanced, but mentally deficient simpleton who moves through the house via the dumb-waiter. Virginia is obsessed with spiders, and has more than once murdered visitors in a game of "spider", trapping them by rigging a window to snap shut on them before hacking them to death with butcher knives. Elizabeth is regarded by Bruno as the most responsible of the three, but is also conniving and infatuated with the concept of hate. The children hold a steadfast respect and affection for Bruno, but increasingly disregard his admonitions against their darker impulses.

Virginia's latest victim is a delivery man serving notice that Peter Howe and his sister Emily, distant relatives of the Merrye family, are coming with their lawyer Schlocker and his secretary Ann, seeking to claim the property as rightful heirs. Bruno hastily coaches the children in enough social etiquette to pass muster before the visitors arrive. Schlocker is outraged that the children have been in the sole care of Bruno (who did not acquire legal guardianship) and have never attended school. Bruno tells him the children are mentally retarded and resists the suggestion to put them in an institution, having sworn to their father to protect them for life. Emily and Schlocker insist on staying overnight to examine the situation, but with only two rooms available, Peter takes Ann into town to stay at an inn.

Schlocker investigates the house, going down to the basement, where he finds the Merrye patriarch's siblings are kept in a pit. Virginia and Elizabeth murder Schlocker to prevent him from reporting this discovery. Bruno realizes it will be impossible to keep this latest murder covered up, and leaves to fetch dynamite from a nearby construction site, planning to blow up the entire Merrye family rather than allow them to be confined. In his absence, Emily finds Schlocker's body as Virginia and Elizabeth are trying to dispose of it. The girls chase Emily out into the woods, where she is captured and raped by Ralph.

Finding no rooms available in town, Peter and Ann return to the mansion. Elizabeth, fearing the consequences if their crimes are discovered, escorts Ann to her room, leading her into the clutches of Ralph, while Virginia starts a game of "spider" with Peter, tying him to a chair and preparing to "sting" him with her knives. Elizabeth intervenes to ask for help with Ann, who is struggling against her and Ralph.

In the woods, Emily awakes traumatised and delirious. Sexually aggressive and murderous, she returns to the house and attacks Ralph while his sisters defend him. Meanwhile, Peter escapes his confinement and frees Ann. Bruno arrives with the dynamite and urges Peter to flee. Peter escorts Ann to safety as the house explodes behind them, killing Bruno and the Merrye family.

Peter, as the sole remaining heir, inherits the vast Merrye family fortune, marries Ann, and writes a book on the Merrye Syndrome phenomenon. His branch of the family, being rather distant, has never been afflicted by the syndrome. However, ten years later, while wandering outside, Peter and Ann's young daughter is fascinated by a spider.

Cast
 Lon Chaney Jr. as Bruno (as Lon Chaney)
 Carol Ohmart as Emily Howe
 Quinn Redeker as Peter Howe
 Beverly Washburn as Elizabeth
 Jill Banner as Virginia
 Sid Haig as Ralph
 Mary Mitchel as Ann
 Karl Schanzer as Schlocker
 Mantan Moreland as Messenger
 Carolyn Cooper as Aunt Clara
 Joan Keller Stern as Aunt Martha

Production

The location chosen was the (now historic) Smith Estate in the Highland Park neighborhood of Los Angeles.

The film was shot between August and September 1964. However, due to the original producer's bankruptcy, the film was not released until December 24, 1967. Spider Baby suffered from poor marketing as well as a series of title changes, being billed alternatively as The Liver Eaters, Attack of the Liver Eaters, Cannibal Orgy, and The Maddest Story Ever Told. Although these alternate titles have little or no relation to the plot, the latter two appear in the lyrics of the title song sung by Chaney: "This cannibal orgy is strange to behold in the maddest story ever told." The opening titles of the film also dub it Spider Baby or, The Maddest Story Ever Told.

The cinematographer was Alfred Taylor, who had previously worked on the film The Atomic Brain. The entire production cost about $65,000, and took only 12 days to shoot in black and white. The film was released as a double bill with Hell's Chosen Few.

Release
Spider Baby first opened theatrically in Fremont, Ohio, as a double feature with The Wizard of Mars on December 8, 1967. It opened in Shreveport, Louisiana, the following week, on December 13, 1967.

Critical response

Author and film critic Leonard Maltin awarded the film two and a half out of a possible four stars, saying, "At its best it's both scary and funny." Bruce G. Hallenbeck commented in his book Comedy-Horror Films: A Chronological History, 1914-2008 that "Spider Baby has a diseased, sickly atmosphere that anticipates that of David Lynch's Eraserhead (1976), with Alfred Taylor's black and white cinematography contributing images of death and decay that are still disturbing today." He particularly noted Lon Chaney, Jr.'s performance as being among the actor's best, portraying Bruno as a likable but misguided "enabler" for his wards.

Home media
In 1999, a DVD of the film's original laserdisc transfer was released, including a cast and crew reunion and a commentary track by Hill. In 2007, Dark Sky Films released a version featuring Hill's director's cut, a new commentary with co-star Haig and multiple documentaries on the making of the film. In 2015, British home video distributor Arrow Films released a director-approved Blu-ray/DVD combo special edition of the film.

Legacy

Stage adaptations

A musical version of Spider Baby played small community theaters, looking for a wider audience. It opened at the Empty Space theater in Bakersfield, California, on Halloween 2004. In October 2007, it opened in Brookings, Oregon, at the local Grange Hall, and in Orlando, Florida, at the Black Orchid Theater.

In 2009, the musical toured with stops in Fresno, Los Angeles, Bakersfield, Tehachapi and San Francisco. A 2010 multi-city tour had stops in Las Vegas, Toronto, and Los Angeles.

In 2012, it played in San Diego, California, at the 10th Avenue Arts Centre as part of Gamercon and Terror at the 10th, respectively.

The soundtrack for the musical version was the final project at Buck Owens' recording studio in Bakersfield.

In music
The film's theme song has been covered at least three times: By the band Fantômas on their film-score covers album The Director's Cut, by crossover thrash band The Accüsed on 1988's Martha Splatterhead's Maddest Stories Ever Told as "The Maddest Story Ever Told", and by Kid Congo Powers.

Remake

In 2007, independent film producer Tony DiDio began preparing a remake of the film, featuring original director Hill as executive producer, and Jeff Broadstreet as director.

Broadstreet stated in an interview, "We're going to stick very closely to the basic story of the original film, and at the same time dig deeper into the backstory of the inbred Merrye family." The new script by Robert Valding "expands on the themes of unconditional love, and also the story elements of cannibalism and the mutant relatives in the basement".

In 2009, Spider Baby writer/director Hill and END Films launched the "official Spider Baby website", featuring historical information about the film, director/cast biographies, video clips and photo galleries.

Preservation and archival status
In 2012, the film was preserved by the Academy Film Archive, using the original camera negative. A new fine grain master positive, new duplicate negative and new prints were created, as well as analog and digital soundtrack masters.

References

External links
 
 
 
 
 Spider Baby official website
 
 
 Spider Baby the musical

1967 films
1960s English-language films
1967 horror films
1960s black comedy films
1960s comedy horror films
American comedy horror films
Films directed by Jack Hill
Incest in film
American black comedy films
Films about cannibalism
American black-and-white films
Films scored by Ronald Stein
1967 comedy films
1967 drama films
Films shot in Los Angeles
1960s American films